The U-20 Africa Cup of Nations officially known as  TotalEnergies U-20 Africa Cup of Nations for sponsorship reason (previously known as the African Youth Championship or unofficially the African U-20 Championship) is the main international youth football competition for CAF nations, and is competed for by under 20 year olds. It is held every two years with the top 4 teams qualifying for the FIFA U-20 World Cup.

History

From 1979 until 1989, the African representatives were determined purely on a home and away qualifying basis without a final tournament, with the African champions determined through the same qualification. Since 1991 there has been a qualifying stage followed by a final tournament played by 8 teams in a chosen country.

On 6 August 2015, the CAF Executive Committee decided to change the name of the tournament from the African Youth Championship to the U-20 Africa Cup of Nations, similar to the senior's version, Africa Cup of Nations.

In July 2016, Total has secured an eight-year sponsorship package from the Confederation of African Football (CAF) to support 10 of its principal competitions, including the U-20 Africa Cup of Nations Champions League, renamed Total U-20 Africa Cup of Nations.

Tournament summary

African U-21 Qualifying for World Cup

African U-21 Cup of Nations

African U-21 Championship

African U-20 Championship

Africa U-20 Cup of Nations

Performance by nation

Source for winners and runners-up: RSSSF

* = As hosts

Participating nations

Legend

 – Champions
 – Runners-up
 – Third place
 – Fourth place
 – Semi-finals
QF – Quarter-finals
GS – Group stage
PR – Preliminary round
1R – First round
2R – Second round
q – Qualified
 — Hosts
 ×  – Did not enter
 •  – Did not qualify
 ×  – Withdrew before qualification
 — Withdrew after qualification
 — Disqualified after qualification

Participating nations by year of debut
Participating nations by Debut (Until 1989, counted Round 1, after 1991 counting Final 16)

Before 1989
1985: , 
1987: 

After 1991
1993: ,  (hosts), 
1997: , 
1999: , 
2003: , 
2005: ,  (hosts)
2007: ,  (hosts)
2009:  (hosts)
2011: No new team
2013: , 
2015: No new team
2017: No new team
2019:  (hosts)
2021: ,  (hosts), 
2023:

Player awards

FIFA U-20 World Cup performances

Legend

1st – Champions
2nd – Runners-up
3rd – Third place
4th – Fourth place

QF – Quarterfinals
R2 – Round 2
R1 – Round 1
     – Hosts
q – Qualified for upcoming tournament

See also
 Africa Cup of Nations
 Africa U-23 Cup of Nations
 Africa U-17 Cup of Nations
 FIFA U-20 World Cup

References

External links
 
 Results of all tournaments by RSSSF

 
U-20 Cup of Nations